The Mitchell Range is a subrange of the Hogem Ranges of the Omineca Mountains, bounded by Takla Lake and the Nation River in northern British Columbia, Canada.

Further reading

References

External links
Mitchell Range in the Canadian Mountain Encyclopedia

Omineca Mountains